Pseudatomoscelis seriatus, the cotton fleahopper, is a species of plant bug in the family Miridae. It is found in the Caribbean Sea, Central America, North America, and South America.

References

Further reading

External links

 

Phylini
Articles created by Qbugbot
Insects described in 1876